Alex Da Silva is a Brazilian dancer and choreographer, specializing in Salsa dancing.  Da Silva is also known for being a recurring guest choreographer on the Fox TV show So You Think You Can Dance.

Biography
Da Silva was born March 27, 1968, in Rio de Janeiro, Brazil.  He discovered Salsa dancing at the age of 20.  He is credited with contributing to the LA-style of salsa dancing.  Da Silva started his career as a salsa dancer and instructor in the San Francisco Bay Area.

Rape charge and conviction
In 2009, Da Silva was charged with "four counts of forcible rape, two counts of assault with intent to commit rape and two counts of sexual penetration by a foreign object."  Da Silva stated he was innocent and pleaded not guilty to all charges. He had stated in interviews that the sex was consensual and that the women were trying to extort money from him and they may have known each other as they came from the same small town.

Da Silva was arrested in August 2009, and unable to pay bail set at two million dollars, he remained in jail for two years as mistrials and delays prevented his case from reaching a conclusion.

On September 16, 2011, a downtown Los Angeles jury found Alex Da Silva, 43, guilty of raping a 22-year-old woman in August 2002 and assault with intent to commit rape involving another woman in March 2009.

On January 27, 2012, L.A. Superior Court Judge Kathleen Kennedy,  defense attorney Carlos Valdez. Valdez and associates Santa Ana CA handed down a 10-year prison sentence in reference to the 2009 arrest.

Da Silva was released from prison on February 15, 2018. He was deported back to Brazil soon after.

SYTYCD choreography

 Favourite routines:
 Mambo with Benji Schwimmer and Heidi Groskreutz was chosen by Benji Schwimmer (winner) as his best performed routine season 2

See also
 List of dancers

References

External links
 Alex Da Silva on SalsaWiki

Brazilian male dancers
1968 births
Living people
People from Rio de Janeiro (city)
Brazilian emigrants to the United States
So You Think You Can Dance choreographers
American male dancers
Salsa dancers
20th-century Brazilian dancers
21st-century Brazilian dancers
21st-century American dancers
Brazilian people convicted of rape